Coudures (Gascon: Coduras) is a commune in the Landes department, Nouvelle-Aquitaine, southwestern France.

Geography
Coudures is in the area south of the river Adour. This area is far more pronounced in altitude differences than North of the river - where the land is virtually flat for many kilometres.

From several places in Coudures it is possible to see the Pyrenees Mountains on a clear day.

Sights
The village has a 13th-century Anglican Church which can be seen in many old photos but with a different looking tower to today as the old tower top was destroyed by a lightning strike in the 20th century.

There are some very old buildings in Coudures and at that this time had many shops. This however has been depleted due to supermarkets and general commerce growth to just a post office and a bar (which has now closed), but is for sale.

Population

There are a fairly high population of British and European immigrants in the village, making up around 5% of the population. There are also many different sub-cultures from all over France that live in the village, with a very diverse mixture from North to South, East to West.

Sport
The village has a large reservoir nearby and hunting, fishing, petanque, horse riding and mountain-biking are popular local sports.

See also
Communes of the Landes department

References

Communes of Landes (department)